The Champions is a 1983 Hong Kong action sports comedy film written and directed by Brandy Yuen and starring Yuen Biao.

Synopsis
Lee Tung (Yuen Biao) is taunted by rival football teams. At first he is just a ball boy and a punch bag for the leading villain, King (Dick Wei). But after too many beatings, Tung decides to play for another local team and to go against King in a one-off football match at the end. The film also tackles problems of jealousy, corruption and bullying in sports.

Cast
Yuen Biao as Lee Tung
Cheung Kwok-keung as Suen
Dick Wei as King
Moon Lee as Fanny
Eddy Ko as Tung's Uncle
Cheung King-po as King's assistant
Kam Biu as Soccer bets syndicate's boss
Tong Tin-hei as Seng Sun Team's boss
Tino Wong as 3rd Master
Ho Pak-kwong as 3rd Master's assistant
Fung King-man as Village contest's emcee
Yue Tau-wan as Social soccer player
Brandy Yuen as Man who helps buy betting tickets
Yuen Lung-kui as Man who hits gong
Johnny Cheung as King's soccer player
Lee Chun-wa as Muscle man arm-wrestling with Tung
Liu Hok-man as Pickpocket / Soccer player
Victor Yeung as Soccer spectator
Yeung Wai as Jogger (cameo)
Lee Fat-yuen as 3rd Master's thug
To Siu-ming as Pool attendee
Ho Tin-shing as Chuen
Sin Yuk-lung as Participant at village contest
Yeung Wah as Participant at village contest
Ho Wah
Lung Ying
Sa Au
Man Ngai-tik
Leung Hung
Ernest Mauser as VIP at soccer stadium opening
Benny Lai as King's soccer player
Ko Hung as Social soccer player
Chan Leung as Soccer player
Sham Chin-po as Social soccer player

Critical response
Variety applauded the film's "impeccably-choreographed action sequences" while also acknowledging that "the storyline (the underdogs make good) and acting are secondary", with only the final football match being criticized for taking place "in some obscure sand lot that truly weakens the impact."

Accolades
In 1985, the film was nominated for the Hong Kong Film Award for Best Action Choreography for Brandy Yuen and Yuen Shun-yi at the 3rd Hong Kong Film Awards.

References

External links

HK Cinemagic entry

1983 films
1980s action comedy films
1983 martial arts films
Hong Kong action comedy films
Hong Kong martial arts films
Hong Kong sports comedy films
Hong Kong martial arts comedy films
1980s sports comedy films
Association football films
Golden Harvest films
1980s Cantonese-language films
Films set in Hong Kong
Films shot in Hong Kong
1983 comedy films
1980s Hong Kong films